Thiene is a city and comune in the province of Vicenza, in northern Italy, located approximately  west of Venice and  east of Milan.

The city has an active and lively industrial sector, composed mainly of small to medium-sized companies.

The Centro Europeo per i Mestieri del Patrimonio is located at Villa Fabris.

This wealthy community has recently been the destination of numerous immigrants, primarily from Morocco, Asia and Central Europe.

History
Of ancient Roman origin, it was acquired by the Visconti of Padua in the Middle Ages. Later it was a free commune, and subsequently part of the Republic of Venice.

Economy
Once Volare Group had its head office in Thiene.

Main sights
Landmarks include:
Palazzo Porto Colleoni Thiene (called The Castle, and also villa), built in the 15th century according to late Venetian-Gothic style. The main façade is characterized by a central portico with mullioned windows flanked by towers with merlons. The interior has frescoes by Giovanni Antonio Fasolo with Giovanni Battista Zelotti.
Villa Thiene Cornaggia -Gothic architecture palace from the 15th century.
Villa Beregan Cunico (17th century).
Duomo -Baroque style Cathedral of Thiene
San Vincenzo - Romanesque Gothic church dating to 1333; frescoes depicting the life of St Vincent date to 15th century.
Oratory of the Natività della Vergine - small gothic jewel of a church.

Notable people
 
 
Arturo Ferrarin (1895 - 1941), famous Italian aviator
Franco Dal Maso (born 1942), retired Italian professional football player
Davide Rigon (born 1986), Italian racing driver
Thomas Ceccon (born 2001), Italian swimmer, current world record holder in the long course 100 metre backstroke with a time of 51.60 seconds

References

External links
 
Official website 
Castle of Thiene

Castles in Italy